Erythropterus kochi is a species of beetle in the family Cerambycidae. It was described by Clarke in 2007.

References

Heteropsini
Beetles described in 2007